The 2021 Portuguese Social Democratic Party leadership election was held on 27 November. If no candidate achieved more than 50% of the votes in the first round, a second round would be held between the two most voted candidates in the first round on 1 December, however, as only two candidates will be on the ballot, a second round will not be necessary. The original date for the first round was 4 December, but the party decided to advance the date by a week.

One issue identified during the campaign was the rise of the far-right Chega!. Though neither candidate said they would invite the party into government, Rio signalled he would be open to negotiating with them on a case-by-case basis, while Rangel ruled this out, saying he would only negotiate with CDS – People's Party and Liberal Initiative.

Rui Rio defeated Paulo Rangel by a 52.4% to 47.6% margin and was reelected for a 3rd term as party leader. He led the party into the 2022 snap general elections, which he lost, losing 2 seats in the Assembly of the Republic and that resulted in an absolute majority to the Socialist Party.

Candidates

Withdrew
 Nuno Miguel Henriques, councillor in Alenquer (2021–present) and failed candidate for the PSD leadership in 2012;

Declined
 Pedro Passos Coelho, former Prime Minister (2011-2015) and PSD leader (2010-2018);
 Luís Montenegro, former PSD caucus leader and candidate for the party's leadership in 2020;
 Miguel Pinto Luz, Deputy mayor of Cascais and candidate for the party's leadership in 2020;
 Miguel Poiares Maduro, former Minister for Regional Development (2013-2015);
 Jorge Moreira da Silva, former Environment Minister (2013-2015);

Opinion polls

All voters

PSD voters

Results

See also
 Social Democratic Party (Portugal)
 List of political parties in Portugal
 Elections in Portugal

References

External links
PSD Official website

Political party leadership elections in Portugal
2021 elections in Portugal
December 2021 events in Portugal
Portuguese Social Democratic Party leadership election